Dolichopus discifer is a European species of fly in family Dolichopodidae. It is sometimes stated to be a synonym of Dolichopus nigricornis , but according to Collin (1940) this synonymy should not be accepted, and the probable type of D. nigricornis (a female in Vienna) was Hercostomus gracilis .

Gallery

References 

discifer
Diptera of Europe
Articles containing video clips
Insects described in 1831